György Fehér (12 February 1939 – 15 July 2002) was a Hungarian film director and screenwriter. His film Szenvedély was screened in the Un Certain Regard section at the 1998 Cannes Film Festival.

Filmography
 III. Richárd (1973)
 Volpone (1974)
 Rejtekhely (1978)
 Nevelésügyi sorozat I. (1989)
 Szürkület (1990)
 Szenvedély (1998)

References

External links

1939 births
2002 deaths
Hungarian film directors
Male screenwriters
Hungarian male writers
Writers from Budapest
20th-century Hungarian screenwriters